Andrea Morassi (born August 30, 1988) is an Italian ski jumper who has competed since 2003. Competing in two Winter Olympics, he had his best finish of 11th in the team large hill event at Turin in 2006 while earning his best individual finish of 36th in the individual normal hill event at those same games.

Morassi's best finish at the FIS Nordic World Ski Championships was 11th in the team large hill event at Liberec in FIS Nordic World Ski Championships 2009 while his best individual finish was 22nd in the individual large hill event at Sapporo two years earlier.

His best World Cup finish was third in an individual large hill event at Germany in 2007.

Further notable results
 2004: 2nd, Italian championships of ski jumping
 2005:
 2nd, Italian championships of ski jumping
 2nd, Italian championships of ski jumping, large hill
 2006:
 1st, Italian championships of ski jumping, large hill
 2nd, Italian championships of ski jumping
 2007:
 2nd, Italian championships of ski jumping
 2nd, Italian championships of ski jumping, large hill
 2008: 3rd, Italian championships of ski jumping, large hill
 2011:
 2nd, Italian championships of ski jumping
 2nd, Italian championships of ski jumping, large hill

References

1988 births
Living people
People from Tolmezzo
Italian male ski jumpers
Olympic ski jumpers of Italy
Ski jumpers at the 2006 Winter Olympics
Ski jumpers at the 2010 Winter Olympics
Sportspeople from Friuli-Venezia Giulia